The Department of Energy (abbreviated as DOE) is the executive department of the Philippine government responsible for preparing, integrating, manipulating, organizing, coordinating, supervising, and controlling all plans, programs, projects and activities of the Government relative to energy exploration, development, utilization, distribution and conservation.

History
The Department of Energy was created by then-president Ferdinand Marcos as he issued Presidential Decree No. 1206 which created the Ministry of Energy and attached the National Power Corporation and Philippine National Oil Company to this new agency. The ministry and its two bureaus (Bureau of Energy Development and Bureau of Energy Utilization) remained intact but was downgraded into a mere Office of Energy Affairs—headed by Wenceslao de la Paz and reporting to then Deputy Executive Secretary for Energy Catalino Macaraig, Jr. based in Malacanang—during the administration of President Corazon Aquino. During the presidency of Fidel V. Ramos, the department was created due to Republic Act No. 7638 otherwise known as the Department of Energy Act of 1992.

The department was vested additional powers and functions under Republic Act No. (RA)  8479 or the "Downstream Oil Deregulation Act of 1997", RA 9136 or the "Electric Power Industry Reform Act of 2001", RA 9367 or "Biofuels Act of 2006", RA 9513 or "Renewable Energy Act of 2008, RA 11234 or "Energy Virtual One Stop Shop Act", RA 11285 or "Energy Efficiency and Conservation Act", RA 11592 or "LPG Industry Regulation Act", RA 11646 or "Microgrid Systems  Act", and RA 11697 or "Electric Vehicle Industry Development Act."

Organization
The department is headed by the Secretary of Energy who is assisted by three Undersecretaries and three Assistant Secretaries. Under the department are the Administrative Service, Financial Service, Information Technology and Management Service, Legal Service and Energy Research Testing and Laboratory Service. In place of regional offices, the department has field offices for Luzon in Rosales, Pangasinan, Visayas in Cebu City, and Mindanao in Davao City.

List of secretaries of the Department of Energy

Bureaus

See also
U.S. Department of Energy
Department of Energy (United Kingdom)

References

External links
Department of Energy (Philippines)

 
Energy in the Philippines
Philippines
Philippines, Energy
Energy